Zheng Shuang may refer to:

Zheng Shuang (artist) (born 1936), Chinese woodcut artist
Zheng Shuang (actress, born 1966), Chinese actress
Zheng Shuang (actress, born 1991), Chinese actress

See also
Zhang Shuang (disambiguation)